Isochorista panaeolana is a species of moth of the family Tortricidae. It is found in Australia, where it has been recorded from New South Wales, the Australian Capital Territory and Tasmania. The habitat consists of wet eucalypt forests and open dry eucalypt forests.

The wingspan is about 11 mm.

The larvae feed on Eucalyptus species, joining dead leaves on the ground.

References

Moths described in 1881
Archipini